Vojkovice is a municipality and village in Karlovy Vary District in the Karlovy Vary Region of the Czech Republic. It has about 600 inhabitants.

Administrative parts
The village of Jakubov is an administrative part of Vojkovice.

History
The first written mention of Vojkovice is from 1088, when the village was called Vikvice. Jakubov was first mentioned in 1144, when both villages became property of the newly established monastery in Doksany.

References

Villages in Karlovy Vary District